Ignacio Vergara Gimeno (Valencia, 1715 - 13 April 1776, Valencia) was a Spanish Baroque sculptor.

Life and work
He began his artistic apprenticeship in the studios of his father, who was also a sculptor. His brother,  began his career there as well, but went on to be a painter.

He was one of the founders and Director-General of the Academia de Bellas Artes de Santa Bárbara, which later became the Real Academia de Bellas Artes de San Carlos de Valencia. He was also an Academician of Merit at the Real Academia de Bellas Artes de San Fernando in Madrid. 

He also did large scale wood carvings.  

All of these works are in the style of the late Baroque, or Rococo.

References

External links

1715 births
1776 deaths
Spanish sculptors
Spanish male sculptors
Baroque sculptors
People from Valencia